Projectyle s a sports video game originally released in 1990 for the Amiga and Atari ST.

Gameplay
The game is based around a futuristic take on air hockey, albeit one where three participants compete and attempt to score points rather than two.

Development
The game was developed by British developer Eldritch the Cat, and published by Electronic Arts.

Reception
Alan Emrich and Chris Lombardi reviewed the game for Computer Gaming World, and stated that "Projectyle would be just another "Rollerball" rip-off if it weren't for the flavor that is added in terms of individual players with ratings in 6 statistics, unique home fields with personalities of their own, and special effects objects that add twists to the game play."

Reviews
ST Format (Jul, 1991)
Computer and Video Games (Jul, 1990)
ST Format (Jul, 1990)
The One (Jul, 1990)
Zzap! (Jul, 1990)
ASM (Aktueller Software Markt) (Jul, 1990)
The Games Machine (Aug, 1990)
Atari ST User (Aug, 1990)
The Games Machine (Jul, 1990)
ACE (Advanced Computer Entertainment) (Aug, 1990)
Amiga Power (Jul, 1991)
Power Play (Aug, 1990)
CU Amiga (Jul, 1990)
Amiga Power (May, 1991)
Amiga Joker (Sep, 1990)

See also
Shufflepuck Café

References

External links
Projectyle at Lemon Amiga

1990 video games
Amiga games
Atari ST games
Air hockey
Hockey video games
Video games developed in the United Kingdom